Nathaniel Bernard Odomes (born August 25, 1965) is a former professional American football cornerback who played for the Buffalo Bills (1987–1993), Seattle Seahawks (1994–1995), and the Atlanta Falcons (1996).  Before his NFL career, he played for the University of Wisconsin–Madison, returning 36 punts for 359 yards and intercepting 9 passes.  His 7 interceptions in the 1986 season led the Big Ten Conference.  He was selected by the Bills in the second round of the 1987 NFL Draft.

Odomes was one of the top defensive backs in the NFL during the early 1990s, assisting the Bills to four consecutive Super Bowl appearances, and making the Pro Bowl twice (1992 and 1993).  One of his more memorable plays was in a 1992 playoff game known as The Comeback, where he intercepted a pass from future Hall of Fame quarterback Warren Moon to set up Buffalo's game-winning field goal.  In the following season, Odomes led the NFL with 9 interceptions, and made a key interception in the second quarter of Super Bowl XXVIII to help his team build a 13–6 halftime lead.  However, his team still lost the game 30–13.

After the 1993 season, Odomes signed with Seattle and spent two injury-plagued years with the Seahawks. He never suited up for Seattle. Before concluding his NFL career, he played one final season with the Atlanta Falcons in 1996. In his eight NFL seasons, Odomes intercepted 26 passes, which he returned for 224 yards and a touchdown.  He also recorded 3 sacks and recovered 8 fumbles, returning them for 86 yards and 2 touchdowns.

References

American football cornerbacks
Buffalo Bills players
Players of American football from Columbus, Georgia
Seattle Seahawks players
Atlanta Falcons players
American Conference Pro Bowl players
Wisconsin Badgers football players
1965 births
Living people